Travesti may refer to:

 Travesti (gender identity), a transgender identity in South America
 Travesti (theatre), a performance while wearing clothes of the opposite sex
 "Travesti", a section of Arca's 2020 single "@@@@@"

See also 

 Travesty (disambiguation)